King Qingxiang of Chu (died 263 BC) was from 298 to 263 BC the king of the state of Chu during the Warring States period of ancient China.  He was born Xiong Heng and King Qingxiang was his posthumous title.

Xiong Heng's father, King Huai of Chu, was held hostage in 299 BC by King Zhao of Qin when he went to the state of Qin for negotiation.  Xiong Heng then ascended the throne and is posthumously known as King Qingxiang of Chu.  King Huai managed to escape but was recaptured by Qin.  Three years later he died in captivity.

King Qingxiang died in 263 BC and was succeeded by his son King Kaolie of Chu.

In fiction and popular culture
 Portrayed by Su Hang in The Legend of Mi Yue (2015)

References

Monarchs of Chu (state)
Chinese kings
3rd-century BC Chinese monarchs
263 BC deaths
Year of birth unknown